The Coupe de la Ligue Professionelle was the top knockout tournament for the Tunisian league football clubs. It was created in 1999 with the intention of being played among the two top Tunisian football divisions with some invited teams, like the "Selection 2001" in the 2000–01 season for instance, than divided in two separate competitions for each division or level during the 2006–07 season. This led to the birth of the Coupe de la Ligue Professionelle 1 & Coupe de la Ligue Professionelle 2, soon to be dropped and finally canceled at the end of the same season (2006–07).

Coupe de la Ligue Professionelle Finals

Coupe de la Ligue Professionelle 1 Final

Coupe de la Ligue Professionelle 2 Final

Awards
Imed Ketata (2003)

See also
 Tunisian Cup
 Tunisian Super Cup

References

External links
Tunisia - List of Cup Winners, RSSSF.com

Football cup competitions in Tunisia
Tunisian Ligue Professionnelle 1
Tunisian Ligue Professionnelle 2
National association football league cups
Recurring sporting events established in 1999
Recurring sporting events disestablished in 2007
1999 establishments in Tunisia
2009 disestablishments in Tunisia